Jonathan A. Rodden (born August 18, 1971) is an American political scientist. He is a professor of political science at the Stanford University School of Humanities and Sciences and a senior fellow at the Hoover Institution and the Stanford Institute for Economic Policy Research.

Rodden was born August 18, 1971, in St. Louis. He completed a B.A. in political science at University of Michigan in 1993. Rodden was a Fulbright Scholar at the Leipzig University from 1993 to 1994. He earned a Ph.D. in political science at Yale University in 2000.

Selected works

References

External links
Faculty page

Living people
1971 births
Writers from St. Louis
Scientists from St. Louis
American political scientists
21st-century American scientists
Stanford University Department of Political Science faculty
University of Michigan alumni
Yale University alumni